The Atlantic Forest hocicudo (Oxymycterus dasytrichus) is a species of rodent in the family Cricetidae. 

References

Oxymycterus
Endemic fauna of Brazil
Fauna of the Atlantic Forest
Mammals of Brazil
Rodents of South America
Mammals described in 1821